Rochester is an unincorporated community in Andrew County, in the U.S. state of Missouri.

History
The name is a transfer from Rochester, England. A post office called Rochester was established in 1844, and remained in operation until 1935.

References

Unincorporated communities in Andrew County, Missouri
Unincorporated communities in Missouri